Joe Show (previously JoeTube) is an Arabic talk show and political satire television program hosted by Egyptian comedian Youssef Hussein and it airs each Thursday. The show deals mainly with the events in the Arab world in a comic and cynical manner. The 53-minute television program exploits the media lapses, media biases, and striking paradoxes in the rhetoric of political and conflicting positions; It is reintroduced comically. The show consists of 4 segments; the first three cover current events in Egypt, the fourth looks at the rest of the Arab world.

See also
 Al Bernameg

References

External links 

 Youtube channel
Joe Show on Facebook

Egyptian comedy television series
Egyptian television talk shows
Egyptian satirical television shows
Arabic-language television shows
Egyptian Crisis (2011–2014)
Egyptian political satire
Political satirical television series